Frank Cosgrove, also known as Fred Cosgrove, was an English professional footballer who made 103 appearances in the Football League for Plymouth Argyle. He played as a right back. Cosgrove was born in Durham, and played football for hometown club Durham City before joining Plymouth Argyle in 1920. He made 105 appearances for the club in all competitions.

References

Year of birth missing
Year of death missing
Sportspeople from Durham, England
Footballers from County Durham
English footballers
Association football fullbacks
Durham City A.F.C. players
Plymouth Argyle F.C. players
English Football League players
Place of death missing